Für Sie (German: For Her) is a German-language fortnightly women's magazine published in Hamburg, Germany.

History and profile
Für Sie was founded in 1948 and was relaunched in 2009. The magazine was published every fortnight in Hamburg by Jahreszeiten Verlag, a division of Ganske-Verlagsgruppe. Sabine Faeth was the editor-in-chief since 2011. In September 2018 the magazine was sold to the Klambt media group.

In 2004 Für Sie sold 480,372 copies.

References

External links

1948 establishments in Germany
Biweekly magazines published in Germany
German-language magazines
Magazines established in 1948
Magazines published in Hamburg
Women's magazines published in Germany